The Province of Quebec was a colony in British North America which comprised the former French colony of Canada. It was established by the Kingdom of Great Britain in 1763, following the conquest of New France by British forces during the Seven Years' War. As part of the Treaty of Paris, France gave up its claim to the colony; it instead negotiated to keep the small profitable island of Guadeloupe. 

Following the Royal Proclamation of 1763, Canada was renamed the Province of Quebec, and from 1774 extended from the coast of Labrador on the Atlantic Ocean, southwest through the Saint Lawrence River Valley to the Great Lakes and beyond to the confluence of the Ohio and Mississippi Rivers. Portions of its southwest, those areas south of the Great Lakes, were later ceded to the newly established United States in the Treaty of Paris (1783) at the conclusion of the American Revolution; although the British maintained a military presence there until 1796. In 1791, the territory north of the Great Lakes was reorganised and divided into Lower Canada and Upper Canada.

History
Under the Proclamation, Quebec included the cities of Quebec and Montreal, as well as a zone surrounding them, but did not extend as far west as the Great Lakes or as far north as Rupert's Land.

In 1774, the Parliament of Great Britain, Frederick North, Lord North, Prime Minister, passed the Quebec Act that allowed Quebec to restore the use of French customary law in private matters alongside the English common law system, and allowing the Catholic Church to collect tithes. The act also enlarged the boundaries of Quebec to include the Ohio Country and part of the Illinois Country, from the Appalachian Mountains on the east, south to the Ohio River, west to the Mississippi River and north to the southern boundary of lands owned by the Hudson's Bay Company, or Rupert's Land.

Through Quebec, the British Crown retained access to the Ohio and Illinois Countries after the Treaty of Paris (1783) ceded control of this land to the United States. By well-established trade and military routes across the Great Lakes, the British continued to supply not only their own troops but a wide alliance of Native American nations through Detroit, Fort Niagara, Fort Michilimackinac, and so on, until these posts were turned over to the United States following the Jay Treaty (1794).

Quebec retained its seigneurial system after the conquest. Owing to an influx of Loyalist refugees from the American Revolutionary War, the demographics of Quebec came to shift and now included a substantial English-speaking Protestant element from the former Thirteen Colonies. These United Empire Loyalists settled mainly in the Eastern Townships, Montreal, and what was known then as the pays d'en haut west of the Ottawa River. The Constitutional Act of 1791 divided the colony in two at the Ottawa River, so that the western part (Upper Canada) could be under the English legal system, with English speakers in the majority. The eastern part was named Lower Canada.

Governors

In 1760, following the capitulation of Montreal, the colony was placed under military government, with civil government only instituted beginning in 1764. The following were the governors:
 James Murray 1760–1766
 Guy Carleton, 1st Baron Dorchester 1766–1778
 Sir Frederick Haldimand 1778–1786
 Guy Carleton, 1st Baron Dorchester 1786–1796

There were also "lieutenant governors", but these were merely the deputies of the governors, and should not be confused with the subsequent to 1791 Lieutenant-Governor of Quebec.

 Guy Carleton (lieutenant governor to James Murray)	1766–1768
 Hector Theophilus de Cramahé (lieutenant governor to Guy Carleton)	1771–1782
 Henry Hamilton (lieutenant governor to Frederick Haldimand)	1782–1785
 Henry Hope (lieutenant governor to the Lord Dorchester)	1785–1788
 Alured Clarke (lieutenant governor to the Lord Dorchester)	1790

Counsellors to the governor

The Province of Quebec did not have an elected legislature and was ruled directly by the governor with advice from counsellors. A council responsible to advise the governor (then James Murray) on all affairs of state was created in 1764. In 1774, the Quebec Act created a Council for the Affairs of the Province of Quebec to advise the governor on legislative affairs. The Legislative Council served as an advisory council to the governor until a legislative assembly was established after 1791.

The individuals James Murray called into the council from 1764 to 1766:

List of councillors under Carleton from 1766 to 1774:

Geography

Around 1763 to 1764, the province was divided into two judicial districts:

 Montreal District – covering the western parts of Quebec along the St. Lawrence River including Montreal and much of Ontario (Eastern and Southern Ontario)
 Quebec District – covering the eastern parts of Quebec along the St. Lawrence and Labrador

In 1790, the Trois-Rivières District was formed out of part of Quebec District.

The Trois-Rivières and Quebec districts continued after 1791 when Lower Canada came into existence, while Montreal District west of the Ottawa River became Upper Canada and east of the Ottawa River was partitioned into many electoral districts.

See also

Former colonies and territories in Canada
Territorial evolution of Canada after 1867

References

Further reading
 Burt, Alfred LeRoy. The Old Province of Quebec. Toronto: Ryerson Press; Minneapolis: University of Minnesota Press, 1933. Reprinted Toronto: McClelland and Stewart, 1968.
 Lahaise, Robert and Vallerand, Noël. Le Québec sous le régime anglais : les Canadiens français, la colonisation britannique et la formation du Canada continental. Outremont, Québec : Lanctôt, 1999.
 Neatby, Hilda. Quebec: The Revolutionary Age, 1760–1791. Toronto: McClelland and Stewart, 1966.

 
British North America
Quebec
Quebec
18th century in Quebec
1760s in Canada
1770s in Canada
1780s in Canada
1790s in Canada
Pre-statehood history of Illinois
Pre-statehood history of Indiana
Pre-statehood history of Michigan
Pre-statehood history of Ohio
Pre-statehood history of Wisconsin
Canadian-American culture in Ohio
1760s in New France
States and territories established in 1763
States and territories disestablished in 1791

1763 establishments in the British Empire
1791 disestablishments in the British Empire
18th century in Canada